Rostocker Heide is an Amt in the district of Rostock, in Mecklenburg-Vorpommern, Germany. The seat of the Amt is in Gelbensande.

The Amt Rostocker Heide consists of the following municipalities:
 Bentwisch
 Blankenhagen
 Gelbensande
 Mönchhagen
 Rövershagen

References

Ämter in Mecklenburg-Western Pomerania
Rostock (district)